Under the Hill is an unfinished erotic novel by Aubrey Beardsley, based on the legend of Tannhäuser.  The first parts of it were published in The Savoy and later issued in book form by Leonard Smithers. In 1907, the original manuscript was published and entitled The Story of Venus and Tannhäuser.

A version completed by John Glassco was published in 1959 by Olympia Press, in a limited run of 3000 copies. This completed version was also later introduced into the Olympia Press/New English Library "Traveller's Companion Series" in 1966.

References
 Emma Sutton, Aubrey Beardsley and British Wagnerism in the 1890s, Oxford University Press, 2002, p. 143
 Peter Michelson, Speaking the Unspeakable: a poetics of obscenity, SUNY Press, 1993, pp. 69–72
 Richard Dellamora, Victorian Sexual Dissidence, University of Chicago Press, 1999, p. 104
 Stephen Prickett, Victorian Fantasy, Baylor University Press, 2005, pp. 104–107

1890 British novels
1907 British novels
Victorian novels
British erotic novels
English novels
Works originally published in The Savoy (periodical)
Unfinished novels
Unfinished literature completed by others
1959 British novels